Thomas Joseph O'Rourke  (October 1865 – July 19, 1929) was a 19th-century Major League Baseball catcher born in New York, New York.

External links

Major League Baseball catchers
Boston Beaneaters players
New York Giants (NL) players
Syracuse Stars (AA) players
Portland (minor league baseball) players
Jersey City Skeeters players
Hazleton Pugilists players
Hartford (minor league baseball) players
New Haven (minor league baseball) players
Denver Mountaineers players
Baseball players from New York (state)
19th-century baseball players
1865 births
1929 deaths
Burials at Calvary Cemetery (Queens)